How We Both Wondrously Perish is the second full-length album by American post-hardcore band Being as an Ocean. The album was released on May 6, 2014 on InVogue Records, and is the band's first record to feature rhythm guitarist Michael McGough and drummer Connor Denis.

Critical reception

How We Both Wondrously Perish garnered generally positive reception from the ratings and review of music critics. At Alternative Press, Scott Heisel rated the album three-and-a-half stars out of five, indicating how the release "is significantly more concise and effective than its predecessor". Gregory Heaney of AllMusic rated the album three-and-a-half out of five stars, remarking how "The interplay between the two singers styles is mirrored in the music, which effortlessly oscillates between rapturous ambience and bittersweet drive, giving the band a sound that few of its post-hardcore brethren even come close to touching." At HM Magazine, Sarah Dos Santos rated the album three-and-a-half stars out of five, observing how the group "carrying a unique sound" because it "is peppered with melody and spoken-word, standing out from the rest." Jonathan Kemp of Substream Magazine rated the album three stars out of five, calling it "a great addition to BAAO's catalogue, but it will most certainly not go down as the band’s defining record." At ChristCore, Anthony Ibarra rated the album four out of five stars, affirming how the band "emerges victorious with this album."

Track listing

Personnel 
Being as an Ocean
Tyler Ross – lead guitar
Ralph Sica – bass guitar
Joel Quartuccio – unclean vocals, spoken word, clean vocals on tracks 7-10
 Michael McGough – rhythm guitar, clean vocals
 Connor Denis – drums

Chart performance

References

2014 albums
InVogue Records albums
Being as an Ocean albums